Pit Sara (also Romanized as Pīt Sarā; also known as Pītsareh and Pīt Sūreh) is a village in Rastupey Rural District, in the Central District of Savadkuh County, Mazandaran Province, Iran. At the 2006 census, its population was 101, in 28 families.

References 

Populated places in Savadkuh County